Václav Chaloupka (born 18 February 1998) is a Czech slalom canoeist who has competed at the international level since 2014. Chaloupka is originally from Šternberk, Czech Republic and resides in Prague, home of the Prague-Troja Canoeing Centre.

He won two medals at the 2021 World Championships in Bratislava with a gold in C1 and a silver in the C1 team event. His individual title made him the first to become both World and U23 World Champion in the C1 event, as well as the first Czech to win the title since Petr Sodomka did so in Spittal in 1977. He also won a bronze medal in the C1 event at the 2020 European Championships on his home course in Prague.

He won six medals at the U23 World Championships including a gold, silver and bronze medal in the C1 event at the 2018, 2017 and 2021 events, respectively.

Václav started paddling in 2008 with Sportovní Klub Univerzity Palackého in Olomouc after quitting football due to an injury. He is coached by Miloslav Říha.

Results

World Cup individual podiums

Complete World Cup results

Notes
No overall rankings were determined by the ICF, with only two races possible due to the COVID-19 pandemic.

Complete Championship Results

References

External links

1998 births
Living people
Czech male canoeists
People from Šternberk
Medalists at the ICF Canoe Slalom World Championships
Sportspeople from the Olomouc Region